Hard Knocks may refer to:

Films
 Hard Knocks (1924), a comedy short by James Parrott
 Hard Knocks (1979 film), a 1979 American film
 Hard Knocks (1980 film), a 1980 Australian film starring Tracy Mann
 Hard Knocks: The Chris Benoit Story, a DVD about the professional wrestler

Music
 Hard Knocks (album), a 2010 album by Joe Cocker
 Hard Knocks, a hip hop group on Wild Pitch Records

Television
 Hard Knocks (1987 TV series), an American sitcom featuring Bill Maher
 Hard Knocks (2001 TV series), an American football documentary program produced by NFL Films for HBO
 "Hard Knocks" (Fantastic Four episode)

See also
 School of Hard Knocks, an idiomatic phrase for the education one gets from life
 The Choir of Hard Knocks, a choir consisting of homeless and disadvantaged people in Melbourne, Australia
 Hard Knock Life (disambiguation)